Henri-François-Alphonse Esquiros (23 May 1812 – 12 May 1876) was a French writer born in Paris. He usually wrote with the name Alphonse Esquiros.

After some minor publications he produced L'évangile du peuple (1840), an exposition on the life and character of Jesus as a social reformer. This work was considered an offense against religion and decency, and Esquiros was fined and imprisoned. He was elected in 1850 as a socialist to the Legislative Assembly, but was exiled in 1851 for his opposition to the Second French Empire.

Returning to France in 1869 he was again a member of the Legislative Assembly, and in 1876 was elected to the senate. He died at Versailles on 12 May 1876. He turned to account his residence in England in L'Angleterre et la vie anglaise (5 vols., 1859-1869), portions of which were also published in English, e.g. Cornwall and its Coasts (1865). Among his numerous works on social subjects may be noted Histoire des Montagnards (2 vols., 1847); Paris, ou Les sciences, les institutions, et les moeurs au XIXe siecle (2 vols., 1847); and Histoire des martyrs de la liberté (1851).

Works
Les Hirondelles, 1834
L'Evangile du peuple, 1840
Chants d'un prisonnier, 1841
Paris, ou Les sciences, les institutions, et les moeurs au XIXe siecle, 1847
Histoire des Montagnards, 1847
De la vie future au point de vue socialiste, 1850
Histoire des martyrs de la liberté, 1851
Les Vierges martyres, Les Vierges folles, Les Vierges sages 1840–42, La Morale universelle, 1859
La Néerlande et la vie hollandaise, 1859L'Angleterre et la vie anglaise'', 1869

References

External links
 
 

1812 births
1876 deaths
Writers from Paris
Politicians from Paris
The Mountain (1849) politicians
Members of the National Legislative Assembly of the French Second Republic
Members of the 4th Corps législatif of the Second French Empire
Members of the National Assembly (1871)
French Senators of the Third Republic
Senators of Bouches-du-Rhône
French religious writers
French male non-fiction writers
19th-century French historians
19th-century French male writers